The Lexington Stakes is a Grade III American Thoroughbred horse race for three-year-old horses at a distance of one and one-sixteenth miles on the dirt run annually in April during at Keeneland Race Course in Lexington, Kentucky during their spring meeting.  The event currently offers a purse of $400,000.

History

First running of the event was on 24 October 1936, closing day of Keeneland's inaugural fall meeting as a six furlong race for two-year-olds and was won by Manhasset Stable's White Tie who ran as an entry with Greentree Stable's Tattered (finished 5th) winning by in a time of 1:12 flat. In 1938 the conditions of the event were changed to a handicap for horses three-years-old and older and the distance set at  miles. In 1940 the distance was extended to  miles for two runnings in which Joe DeSoto's Steel Heels won both events including setting a new track record in 1941. In October 1942, Keeneland held its last meeting due to the track being closed during World War II, the event was run as the Lexington Purse over a distance of  miles.

In 1973 Keeneland schedule an overnight allowance event as the Calumet Purse for three year old horses which was held in April during the Spring meeting prior to the signature event of the meeting - Blue Grass Stakes. The event was named after Calumet Farm, a Thoroughbred breeding and training farm in Lexington. The 1975 winner of the event, Master Derby not only completed this double but later in May of that year also won the middle leg of the U.S Triple Crown, Preakness Stakes.

In 1984 the event was renamed to the Lexington Stakes. 

In 1986 the event was upgrade by the American Graded Stakes Committee to Grade III. Two years later the event was once again upgraded to Grade II and held this classification until 2010. 

In 1989 the event has been scheduled after the Blue Grass Stakes and it is rare now that horses will run in both events.
 
The race was downgraded to Grade III status for 2011. 

Since 2013 the event has been the last race with qualification points for the Road to the Kentucky Derby as a Wild Card event.

The event was not held 2020 during Keeneland's spring meeting which was moved to July and shortened due to the COVID-19 pandemic in the United States.

Records
Speed record
 miles – 1:41.00  Charismatic   (1999)

Margins
 9 lengths – Hansel (1991)

Most wins by a jockey
 6 – Jerry Bailey (1982, 1990, 1991, 1993, 1999, 2004)

Most wins by a trainer
 5 – Todd Pletcher (2005, 2008, 2009, 2010, 2013)

Most wins by an owner
 2 – Junius W. Bell (1941, 1942)
 2 – Russell L. Reineman Stable  (1986, 1990)
 2 – Bob & Beverly Lewis (1999, 2003)
 2 – Fern Circle Stables (2017, 2021)

Winners

Legend:

 
 

Notes:

† In the 1973 running of the event, Starkers finished first but was disqualified for interference and was placed second. Our Native was declared the winner.

§ Ran as part of an entry

See also
Road to the Kentucky Derby
 List of American and Canadian Graded races

External links 
 2021 Keeneland Media Guide

References

1936 establishments in Kentucky
Keeneland horse races
Flat horse races for three-year-olds
Triple Crown Prep Races
Graded stakes races in the United States
Grade 3 stakes races in the United States
Recurring sporting events established in 1936